Kevin Burns (1955–2020) was an American television and film producer, director, and screenwriter.

Kevin Burns may also refer to:

 Kevin Burns (cricketer) (born 1960), New Zealand cricketer
 Kevin Burns (fighter) (born 1980), American mixed martial artist
 Kevin Burns (mayor) (born 1958), mayor of North Miami, Florida, 2005–2009
 Kevin Burns (soccer) (born 1985), American soccer player
 Kevin Burns (swimmer) (born 1955), British Olympic swimmer
 Kevin Burns (business magnate), former CEO of Juul